This is a list of waterfalls in India sorted by state. The Indian state of Karnataka has more waterfalls than any other state. Karnataka has 544 waterfalls which are at least 10 metres in height. Maharashtra comes second with 364 waterfalls. Kerala has 319 of them and Tamilnadu takes the fourth place with 296 waterfalls.

Andhra Pradesh

Arunachal Pradesh

Assam

Bihar

Chhattisgarh

Goa

Gujarat

Himachal Pradesh

Jammu and Kashmir
Aharbal Falls

Jharkhand

Karnataka

Kerala 

Idukki district alone has about 50 small or big waterfalls, most of which are not included above because of not being well known and some being only active during monsoons. It is the same with Wayanad district, Pathanamthitta district and other hilly districts.

Madhya Pradesh

Maharashtra

Manipur

Meghalaya

Mizoram

Odisha

Rajasthan

Tamil Nadu

Telangana

Uttar Pradesh

Uttarakhand

See also 
 List of waterfalls in karnataka
 List of waterfalls in India by height

References

External link

Articles containing video clips